Chebykovo (Sabıq; , Nerge) is a rural locality (a village) in Kayrakovsky Selsoviet, Mishkinsky District, Bashkortostan, Russia. The population was 495 as of 2010. There are 6 streets.

Geography 
Chebykovo is located 18 km west of Mishkino (the district's administrative centre) by road. Bikshikovo is the nearest rural locality.

References 

Rural localities in Mishkinsky District